Thomas Digges (c. 1546 – 24 August 1595) was an English mathematician and astronomer. He was the first to expound the Copernican system in English but discarded the notion of a fixed shell of immoveable stars to postulate infinitely many stars at varying distances. He was also first to postulate the "dark night sky paradox".

Life
Thomas Digges, born about 1546, was the son of Leonard Digges (c. 1515 – c. 1559), the mathematician and surveyor, and Bridget Wilford, the daughter of Thomas Wilford, esquire, of Hartridge in Cranbrook, Kent, by his first wife, Elizabeth Culpeper, the daughter of Walter Culpeper, esquire. Digges had two brothers, James and Daniel, and three sisters, Mary, who married a man with the surname of  Barber; Anne, who married William Digges; and Sarah, whose first husband was surnamed Martin, and whose second husband was John Weston.

After the death of his father, Digges grew up under the guardianship of John Dee, a typical Renaissance natural philosopher. In 1583, Lord Burghley appointed Digges, with John Chamber and Henry Savile, to sit on a commission to consider whether England should adopt the Gregorian calendar, as proposed by Dee.

Digges served as a member of parliament for Wallingford and also had a military career as a Muster-Master General to the English forces from 1586 to 1594 during the war with the Spanish Netherlands. In his capacity of Master-Muster General he was instrumental in promoting improvements at the Port of Dover.

Digges died on 24 August 1595. His last will, in which he specifically excluded both his brother, James Digges, and William Digges, was proved on 1 September. Digges was buried in the chancel of the church of St Mary Aldermanbury, London.

Marriage and issue
Digges married Anne St Leger (1555–1636), daughter of Sir Warham St Leger and his first wife, Ursula Neville (d. 1575), the fifth daughter of George Neville, 5th Baron Bergavenny, by his third wife, Mary Stafford. In his will he named two surviving sons, Sir Dudley Digges (1583–1639), politician and statesman, and Leonard Digges (1588–1635), poet, and two surviving daughters, Margaret and Ursula. After Digges's death, his widow, Anne, married Thomas Russell of Alderminster in Warwickshire, "whom in 1616 William Shakespeare named as an overseer of his will".

Work
Digges attempted to determine the parallax of the 1572 supernova observed by Tycho Brahe, and concluded it had to be beyond the orbit of the Moon. This contradicted Aristotle's view of the universe, according to which no change could take place among the fixed stars.

In 1576, he published a new edition of his father's perpetual almanac, A Prognostication everlasting. The text written by Leonard Digges for the third edition of 1556 was left unchanged, but Thomas added new material in several appendices. The most important of these was A Perfit Description of the Caelestiall Orbes according to the most aunciente doctrine of the Pythagoreans, latelye revived by Copernicus and by Geometricall Demonstrations approved. Contrary to the Ptolemaic cosmology of the original book by his father, the appendix featured a detailed discussion of the controversial and still poorly known Copernican heliocentric model of the Universe. This was the first publication of that model in English, and a milestone in the popularisation of science.

For the most part, the appendix was a loose translation into English of chapters from Copernicus' book De revolutionibus orbium coelestium. Thomas Digges went further than Copernicus, however, by proposing that the universe is infinite, containing infinitely many stars, and may have been the first person to do so, predating Giordano Bruno's (1584) and William Gilbert's (1600) same views. According to Harrison:

An illustration of the Copernican universe can be seen above right. The outer inscription on the map reads (after spelling adjustments from Elizabethan to Modern English):

In 1583, Lord Burghley appointed Digges, along with Henry Savile (Bible translator) and John Chamber, to sit on a commission to consider whether England should adopt the Gregorian calendar, as proposed by John Dee; in fact Britain did not adopt the calendar until 1752.

References

Sources and further reading
  
  
  
  
 

Text of the Perfit Description:
Johnson, Francis R.  and Larkey, Sanford V., "Thomas Digges, the Copernican System and the idea of the Infinity of the Universe in 1576," Huntington Library Bulletin 5 (1934): 69–117.
Harrison, Edward Robert (1987) Darkness at Night. Harvard University Press: 211–17. An abridgement of the preceding.
Internet version at Dartmouth retrieved on 2 November 2013
 Gribbin, John, 2002. Science: A History. Penguin.
 Johnson, Francis R., Astronomical Thought in Renaissance England: A Study of the English Scientific Writings from 1500 to 1645, Johns Hopkins Press, 1937.
 Kugler, Martin Astronomy in Elizabethan England, 1558 to 1585: John Dee, Thomas Digges, and Giordano Bruno, Montpellier: Université Paul Valéry, 1982.
 Vickers, Brian (ed.), Occult & Scientific Mentalities in the Renaissance. Cambridge: Cambridge University Press, 1984.

External links
 Digges, Thomas
 Thomas Digges, Gentleman and Mathematician
 John Dee, Thomas Digges and the identity of the mathematician
 Digges' Mactutor biography
 Digges, Thomas (1546–1595), History of Parliament
 

1540s births
1595 deaths
16th-century Calvinist and Reformed Christians
16th-century English mathematicians
Alumni of Queens' College, Cambridge
John Dee
16th-century English astronomers
English MPs 1572–1583
English MPs 1584–1585
Copernican Revolution
People from Dover District